Propination laws were a privilege granted to Polish szlachta that gave landowners a monopoly over profits from alcohol consumed by their peasants. Propination is a historical right to distill spirits.
 
In many cases, profits from propination exceeded those from agricultural production or other sources.

These laws usually included:
 peasants were not allowed to purchase any alcohol not produced in their owner's distillery
 alternatively, they could be allowed to brew their own drinks but had to pay a fee according to the amount produced
 peasants had to buy at least a given quota of vodka or okovita.  Those who didn't comply had the remaining amount dumped in front of their houses and had to pay the costs.

These laws first appeared in the 16th and were widespread by the 17th century.  They lasted until 1845 (Prussian partition), 1889 (Galicia) and 1898 (Russian Partition).

Propination was the main cause for massive alcoholism in Poland; also, because taverns in rural region were leased nearly exclusively to Jews who took part in enforcing these privileges, it was also a major reason for anti-semitism among peasants.

See also
Szlachta privileges
 Arendator

References

Legal history of Poland
Alcohol in Poland
Alcohol in Lithuania
Alcohol law